Brian Westlake is a former footballer who played as a centre forward in the Football League for Colchester United, Doncaster Rovers, Halifax Town and Tranmere Rovers.

Career statistics
Source:

References

1943 births
Living people
Sportspeople from Newcastle-under-Lyme
Association football forwards
English footballers
Stoke City F.C. players
Doncaster Rovers F.C. players
Halifax Town A.F.C. players
Tranmere Rovers F.C. players
Colchester United F.C. players
Macclesfield Town F.C. players
English Football League players
English expatriate footballers
Expatriate footballers in Belgium